Przemysław Porębski (born 30 June 1998) is a Polish footballer who plays for Orzeł Ryczów.

External links
 
 

1998 births
Footballers from Kraków
Living people
Polish footballers
Association football midfielders
Wisła Kraków players
Ekstraklasa players
III liga players